HUMARA Assay is one of the most widely used methods to determine the clonal origin of a tumor. The method is based on X chromosome inactivation and it takes the advantage of having different methylation status of a gene called HUMARA (short for human androgen receptor) that is located on X chromosome. Considering the fact that once one X chromosome is inactivated in a cell, all other cells derived from it will have the same X chromosome inactivated, this approach becomes a great tool to differentiate a monoclonal population from a polyclonal  one in a female tissue. HUMARA gene, in particular, has three important features that make it highly convenient for the purpose.

1-) The gene is located on X chromosome and it goes through inactivation by methylation in normal embryogenesis of a female infant. The fact that most-but not all-genes on X chromosome undergo inactivation, this feature becomes an important one.

2-) Human Androgen Receptor gene alleles have varying numbers of CAG repeats. Thus, when DNA from a healthy female tissue is amplified by PCR for a specific region of the gene, two separated bands can be seen on the gel.

3-) The region that is amplified by PCR also has certain base orders that make it susceptible to be digested by HpaII (or HhaI) enzyme when it is not methylated. This detail gives the opportunity to researchers to differentiate a methylated allele from the unmethylated one.

Thanks to these qualities of HUMARA gene, clonal origin of any tissue from a female mammalian organism can be determined.

The basic process is performed as the following :

1-) DNA from the tissue is isolated.

2-) The isolated DNA is treated with the suitable enzyme (such as HpaII) in optimal conditions for a suggested amount of time (i.e. overnight).

3-) DNA is cleaned and the certain region of HUMARA gene is amplified by PCR using "suitable" primers (as an example, please see:Ref.2)

4-) After running PCR products through a gel, the gel is visualized and the results are analyzed accordingly. If two bands are apparent, the tissue studied is most likely of polyclonal origin. If a single band is observed, the tissue is monoclonal unless two alleles have exactly the same numbers of CAG repeats or different cells with the same inactivated initiated the tumor; so, seemingly monoclonal although it is actually polyclonal.

In order to make a conclusion about the clonality of a tumor, it is best to use the DNA from a normal tissue of the same person, and a sample without enzyme treatment must also be amplified as a control. If, even in normal tissues without enzyme treatment, a single band is observed, it may be explained as follows; this person has the genetic pattern as XO (this possibility can be excluded to see a band after enzyme treatment because, if indeed XO is the genetic pattern of the sample, then, there will be NO methylation, therefore no band should be visible after digesting with the enzyme. In the case of seeing a band after enzyme treatment, the observation is most likely to mean that the person has two X chromosomes with exact CAG repeats.) When you see two bands for normal tissue (both enzyme treated and untreated), and you see two bands for enzyme treated tumor sample but two bands for untreated tumor DNA, then you are surely looking at a polyclonal tumor. However, if you see the same number of bands only with a single band after enzyme treatment, there is a rather high chance for the tumor of your interest to be monoclonal. In this last case, monoclonality is not for sure because, as stated earlier, there is the possibility of having exact same -CAG- repeats on both alleles.

References

Carcinogenesis
Molecular genetics